was a Japanese voice actor from Tokyo, Japan. On July 7, 2006, Nomoto vomited blood at home and - after having been transported to the hospital - died. The cause of his death is unknown. He was 75 years of age.

Notable voice roles

Anime
Blocker Gundan 4 Machine Blaster (Zangyakku)
City Hunter (Yotagawa)
Dokaben (Ieyasu Tokugawa)
Dragon Ball GT (Rou Dai Kaioshin)
Dragon Ball Z (Rou Dai Kaioshin)
Esper Mami (role unspecified)
Ganso Tensai Bakabon (role unspecified)
GeGeGe no Kitaro 1985 (role unspecified)
GeGeGe no Kitaro 1996 (role unspecified)
Genesis Climber Mospeada (Pierrot)
Gyakuten Ippatsu-man (role unspecified)
Hurricane Polymar (role unspecified)
The Kabocha Wine (role unspecified)
Kaibutsu-kun (Dr. Noh)
Karasu Tengu Kabuto (Jaki)
Karate Baka Ichidai (role unspecified)
Lightspeed Electroid Albegas (Officer Daim, principal)
Meiken Jolie (role unspecified)
Mooretsu Atarou (role unspecified)
O-bake no... Holly (Yabukofu)
Obake no Q-Tarō (Kaminari-san)
Perrine Monogatari (role unspecified)
Robokko Beeton (Noble-san)
Science Ninja Team Gatchaman (role unspecified)
Sentimental Journey (Wakana's grandfather)
Takarajima (Tom Morgan)
Tekkaman: The Space Knight (role unspecified)
Tensai Bakabon (role unspecified)
Time Bokan (role unspecified)
Wansa-kun (role unspecified)

OVAs
Adventure Kid (Doctor Masago)
Blue Seed Beyond (Tomezo)
Legend of Crystania (old man)
Ushio and Tora (old man)
Wizardry (old beggar, tavern owner)

Films
Doraemon: What Am I for Momotaro (villager)
Doraemon: Nobita's Dorabian Knights (minion)
Ninja Scroll (Mushizou)
Porco Rosso (role unspecified)
Yōtōden Kira no Masa

Video Games
Genei Tōgi: Shadow Struggle (Han Fei Lan)

Miscellaneous
X-Bomber (Kozlo)
Gosei Sentai Dairanger (Baron String (ep. 1 - 2), Count Kaleidoscope (ep. 36), New Gorma-Monster (ep. 50))
Gosei Sentai Dairanger Movie (Baron String/Great King Ojaru  (Voice of Kenichi Ishii and Miyuki Nagato, Hideaki Kusaka, Nobuyuki Hiyama))
Juukou B-Fighter (Mercenary Bardas) (Ep 8)

Dubbing
Creepshow 2 (The Hitchhiker (Tom Wright))
The New Adventures Of Batman (Penguin / Oswald Cobblepot)

References

 

1930 births
2006 deaths
Japanese male voice actors
Male voice actors from Tokyo
Arts Vision voice actors